Högl is a Bavarian mountain. Johannishögl is a smaller cone on the mountain. 

Mountains of Bavaria
Mountains of the Alps